Estonia–Latvia Interconnection (Vireši–Tallinn pipeline) is a natural gas pipeline interconnection between Estonia and Latvia. In Vireši, the pipeline is connected with Izborsk–Inčukalns pipeline, which provides for Estonia access to the Inčukalns underground gas storage. The pipeline has one compression station in Vireši and one metering station in Karksi.

The direction of gas flow is from Latvia to Estonia. There is a plan for upgrade to allow bidirectional gas flow.

See also

 Energy in Estonia

References 

Natural gas pipelines in Estonia
Natural gas pipelines in Latvia